Tomala may refer to:

Tomala (surname), a Polish surname
Tomalá,a municipality in the Honduran department of Lempira
, a 2002 album of Chilean band Los Tetas

See also